The 2002 Philippine Basketball Association (PBA) Governors' Cup, also known as the 2002 Samsung-PBA Governors' Cup for sponsorship reasons, was the first conference of the 2002 PBA season. It started on February 10 and ended on May 26, 2002. The tournament requires two imports per each team.

Rule changes
To prepare the national team for the upcoming 2002 Asian Games in Busan, South Korea, the following FIBA rules were adopted for this conference:
Zone defense will be allowed. 
Total time of the game would be reduced to 40 minutes, 10-minute quarters. 
The time allowed for an offensive team to cross the halfcourt line was reduced from 10 to eight seconds.

In addition, the pool of the national team was distributed into two teams: the Selecta-RP team and the Hapee-RP team.

Imports
Each team were allowed two imports. The first line in the table are the original reinforcements of the teams. Below the name are the replacement of the import above. Same with the third replacement that is also highlighted with a different color. GP is the number of games played.

Elimination round

Team standings

Bracket

Quarterfinals

(1) Talk 'N Text vs. (8) San Miguel

(2) Coca-Cola vs. (7) Sta. Lucia

(3) Purefoods vs. (6) Red Bull

(4) Alaska vs. (5) FedEx

Semifinals

(2) Purefoods vs. (3) Coca-Cola

(4) Alaska vs. (8) San Miguel

Third place playoff

Finals

References

External links
 PBA.ph

Governors' Cup
PBA Governors' Cup